Al-Mundhir III ibn al-Nu'man, also known as Al-Mundhir ibn Imri' al-Qays (died 554) was the king of the Lakhmids in 503/505–554.

Biography

His mother's name was Maria bint Awf bin Geshem. The son of al-Nu'man II ibn al-Aswad, he succeeded his father either immediately upon his death in 503 or after a short interregnum by Abu Ya'fur ibn Alqama. He is one of the most renowned Lakhmid kings, and is known for his military achievements. These started before he was crowned a king, during the Anastasian War, with a raid in Palaestina Salutaris and Arabia Petraea in the year 503, capturing a large number of Romans. Mundhir's raids covered the area between Euphrates from the east up to Egypt in the west and Najd southward, where in 516 he engaged in a battle with Maadi Karb the Himyarite king.

In 526 a war between Byzantine Empire and Iran began, and Mundhir attacked Syria, ravaging it. Two Roman high-ranking commanders were captured, Timostratus and John. This caused Justinian I to send al-Mundhir an embassy for peace consisting of Abraham son of Euphrasius (his son is Nonnosus the historian) and Simeon of Beth Arsham. They were joined by Sergius of Rasafa (who was later sent by Justinian with gifts to al-Mundhir). In 528 al-Mundhir attacked Syria and returned with much booty. The next year (529) he renewed his attacks, firstly taking all the area of frontiers which was Khabour. Afterwards, he marched towards Arzona and Nisibis spoiling and ravaging the cities before continuing to Apamea and Chalcedon. Al-Mundhir was unable to conquer Antioch because Justinian dispatched a large army to protect it. Al-Mundhir returned with much booty, among them 400 nuns, whom he burnt to the goddess al-Uzza.

Al-Mundhir was killed in the battle of Yawm Halima with the Ghassanids under Al-Harith ibn Jabalah in June 554. He was succeeded by his three sons, 'Amr III (r. 554–569), Qabus (r. 569–573) and al-Mundhir IV (r. 574–580).

Sources

Further reading 
 

6th-century Arabs
554 deaths
6th-century monarchs in the Middle East
Lakhmid kings
Year of birth unknown
People of the Roman–Sasanian Wars
Vassal rulers of the Sasanian Empire
Monarchs killed in action
Generals of Khosrow I
Iberian War
Anastasian War
Arabs from the Sasanian Empire
Generals of Kavad I